Roberto Carlos García Hernández (born 31 August 1982 in Santa Cruz de Tenerife, Canary Islands), known as Roberto Carlos, is a Spanish retired footballer who played as a left back.

External links

1982 births
Living people
Spanish footballers
Association football defenders
Segunda División players
Segunda División B players
Tercera División players
CD Tenerife B players
CD Tenerife players
Atlético Malagueño players
UD Vecindario players
UDA Gramenet footballers
Cultural Leonesa footballers
CD Marino players
Footballers from Santa Cruz de Tenerife